Hermit is the second studio album by recording artist Ron "Bumblefoot" Thal released in January 1997.

Track listing

Personnel
Ron Thal - vocals, guitar, bass
Jeff Thal - drums
Mike Meselsohn - drums on "Sweetmeat", "Gray" and "Unsound"
Daniel Alvaro - saxophone
Suzanne Bass - cello
Ralph Rosa, Tom, Rich & Paul Riccobono, Jennifer Thal, Pete & Lillian Claro, Dave Concepcion, Cindy Garcia, Annabelle, Shawn Anderson, Dave Slevin, Scott Miles, Harran Madry - backing vocals

References 

Ron "Bumblefoot" Thal albums
1997 albums